The Road Hammers II is the second studio album of Canadian country rock group The Road Hammers. It was released on February 24, 2009 on Open Road Recordings. The album also includes the three Michael Knox-produced tracks that were added to the 2008 United States-version of their debut release titled Blood, Sweat and Steel ("I Don't Know When to Quit," "Workin' Hard at Lovin' You" and "I've Got the Scars to Prove It").

Track listing

Chart performance

Singles

2009 albums
Open Road Recordings albums
The Road Hammers albums